Zappa’s Universe is a 1993 Frank Zappa tribute album featuring alumni from many of Zappa's bands. The music was compiled from a series of concerts from four consecutive nights of concerts at The Ritz in New York City, and filmed for a concert video of the same name. Steve Vai’s cover of the song "Sofa" from the album won a Grammy Award for Best Rock Instrumental Performance in 1994.

Exposing Zappa’s illness
When the Zappa’s Universe project was first underway Frank Zappa was supposed to be part of the project, but was too ill to attend the shows. When reporters attempted to find out why, they reported that he was ill. This led to Zappa’s children, Moon and Dweezil exposing to the public for the first time their father’s prostate cancer during a press conference in the fall of 1991. His cancer had been first diagnosed during the spring of 1990.

Track listing
All Songs were written by Frank Zappa

"Elvis Has Just Left the Building" – 2:48
"Brown Shoes Don’t Make It" – 7:26
"The Jazz Discharge Party Hats" – 4:48
"Idiot Bastard Son" - 3:19
"Inca Roads" – 9:38
"Mōggio" – 2:46
"Nite School" – 5:00
"Echidna’s Arf (Of You)" – 3:53
"Hungry Freaks, Daddy" – 3:28
"Heavenly Bank Account" – 4:12
"The Meek Shall Inherit Nothing" – 2:54
"Waka/Jawaka" – 3:28
"Sofa" – 3:51
"Dirty Love" – 7:03
"Hot Plate Heaven at the Green Hotel" – 6:28

Personnel

Musicians
Joel Thome – conductor
Sal Scarpa – assistant conductor
The Persuasions – choir
Rockapella – choir
Dweezil Zappa – guitar (track 13)
Steve Vai – guitar (tracks 12, 13)
Mike Keneally – guitar, keyboards, vocals
Scott Thunes – Bass, vocals
Dale Bozzio – vocals (track 14)
Mats Öberg – keyboards, piano, vocals
Marc Ziegenhagen – keyboards
Morgan Ågren – drums
Abe Appleman – violin
Alvin Rogers – violin
Joyce Hammann – violin
Ming Yeh – violin
Peter Vanderwater – violin
Sandra Billingstea – violin
Sanford Allen – violin
Sheila Reinhold – violin
Stan Hunte – violin
Al Brown – viola
John Dexter – viola
Richard Spencer – viola
Bruce Wang – cello
Fred Zlotkin – cello
John Beal – double bass
Cynthia Otis – harp
Marvin Stamm – trumpet, flugelhorn
Ron Sell –  horn
Jim Pugh – trombone
Dave Taylor – bass trombone, tuba
Virgil Blackwell – clarinet, bass clarinet
Dave Tofani – flute, piccolo, soprano saxophone
Robert Magnuson – oboe, alto saxophone
John Campo – bassoon, tenor saxophone
Roger Rosenberg – baritone saxophone
Jonathan Haas – percussion

The Persuasions
Jay Otis Washington
Jerry Lawson
Jimmy Hayes
Joe Russell

Rockapella
Barry Carl
Elliot Kerman
Scott Leonard
Sean Altman

Production staff
Virgil Blackwell – music coordinator
Walt Taylor - Production Manager
James Badrak - Stage Manager
Mitch Keller - Lighting
Dave "Pops" Clements - Guitar Tech

Record Production
Produced (sort of) by Davitt Sigerson
Executive Producer and Album Compilation by Guy Eckstine
Recorded by David Hewitt
Mixed by Carl Beatty

References

Frank Zappa tribute albums
1993 albums